The 2008–09 Greek Basket League season was the 69th season of the Greek Basket League, the highest tier professional basketball league in Greece.  The 182-game regular season (26 games for each of the 14 teams) began on Saturday, October 4, 2008, and ended on Sunday, May 10, 2009. The playoffs ended on June 3, 2009.

Teams

Regular season

Standings

Pts=Points, Pld=Matches played, W=Matches won, L=Matches lost, F=Points for, A=Points against, D=Points difference

Results

Results as of December 19, 2008

Playoffs
This is the outlook for the 2009 Α1 playoffs. Teams in bold advance to the next round.

Final standings

Aris was granted a wildcard to play in the 2009–10 Euroleague Qualification Round.

Greek League Best Five

References

External links
 Official HEBA Site
 Official Hellenic Basketball Federation Site
 Galanis Sports Data

Greek Basket League seasons
1
Greek